Rafael Joseffy (July 3, 1852 – June 25, 1915) was a Hungarian Jewish pianist, teacher and composer.

Life

Rafael Joseffy was born in Hunfalu, Szepes County
(now Huncovce, Slovakia) in 1852. His youth was spent in Miskolc, and he began his study of the piano there at the age of eight. He studied in Budapest with Friedrich Brauer, the teacher of Stephen Heller. In 1866, he went to Leipzig, where his teachers were Ignaz Moscheles and Ernst Ferdinand Wenzel. In 1868, he became a pupil of Carl Tausig in Berlin, remaining with him for two years. Later he spent two summers with Franz Liszt in Weimar. He made his debut in Berlin in 1872 and was immediately acclaimed as a master pianist of great brilliance.

He moved to the United States in 1879, where he lived in New York City. Joseffy made his American debut in New York in 1879, with an orchestra under Leopold Damrosch. He soon after played with the New York Philharmonic Orchestra, and subsequently made many appearances in New York and other American cities with Theodore Thomas and the Theodore Thomas Orchestra. 

Joseffy was soloist for the inaugural concerts of the Chicago Symphony Orchestra on October 16 and 17, 1891, performing Tchaikovsky's First Piano Concerto with Thomas conducting at the Auditorium Theatre in Chicago.

Joseffy produced numerous popular compositions for the piano as well as editing works of Frédéric Chopin and other composers for G. Schirmer music publishers. Several of his songs were translated from German to English by Helen Tretbar. 

Later in life he virtually retired from the concert platform and devoted his attention to teaching His students included the American composer and singer Florence Turner-Maley. He was a very reserved man. Henry Wolfsohn claimed to have offered Joseffy huge sums for concert tours but the pianist found concert life so severe upon his nerves that he would not accept. He preferred the smaller income of a teacher to the glare of the footlights. While in New York, he spent his summers in Tarrytown. He died in New York City in 1915, aged 62.

References

Sources
 Darryl Lyman: Great Jews in Music. J. D. Publishers, Middle Village, N.Y, 1986.
 Stanley Sadie, H. Wiley Hitchcock (Ed.): The New Grove Dictionary of American Music. Grove's Dictionaries of Music, New York, N.Y. 1986.
 Finding Aid for Rafael Joseffy Music and Personal Papers, 1899–1905 The Sousa Archives and Center for American Music

External links 

 
 Rafael Joseffy - Bach-Cantatas
 

1852 births
1915 deaths
19th-century classical pianists
19th-century male musicians
19th-century Hungarian people
Hungarian male composers
Hungarian classical pianists
Hungarian music educators
Hungarian Jews
Jewish classical pianists
Male classical pianists
Piano pedagogues
People from Kežmarok District